Swapna Sundari may refer to:

 Swapna Sundari (dancer), Indian dancer
 Swapna Sundari (film), a 1950 Telugu film
 Swapnasundari, an upcoming Malayalam film